The 60s decade ran from January 1, AD 60, to December 31, AD 69.

In the Roman Empire, the early part of the decade saw the beginning of the Boudican Revolt in Britannia, where several tribes (chiefly the Iceni), led by Boudica, rebelled against the Roman occupation. The revolt led to the sacking of several Roman cities, but was ultimately quelled by governor Gaius Suetonius Paulinus. In 63, the Roman–Parthian War came to an end with the Treaty of Rhandeia. In 66, the First Jewish-Roman War began, as Jewish rebels fought against Roman rule. Near the end of the decade in 69, the Year of the Four Emperors saw a period of civil war and political instability in the Roman Empire, as four different men (Galba, Otho, Vitellius, and Vespasian) claimed the title of Emperor within the span of a year. Ultimately, the year ended with the ascension of Vespasian to the throne and the beginning of the Flavian Dynasty. In East Asia, the state of Funan was established, while China continued its golden age.

In 62, an earthquake of an estimated magnitude of between 5 and 6 and a maximum intensity of IX or X on the Mercalli scale struck the towns of Pompeii and Herculaneum, severely damaging them. The towns of Pompeii and Herculaneum both suffered major damage, with damage to some buildings also reported from Naples and Nuceria. Seneca reported the death of a flock of 600 sheep that he attributed to the effects of poisonous gases. Later, in 64, the Great Fire of Rome began in the merchant shops around Rome's chariot stadium, Circus Maximus. After six days, the fire was brought under control, but before the damage could be assessed, the fire reignited and burned for another three days. In the aftermath of the fire, two thirds of Rome had been destroyed. According to Tacitus and later Christian tradition, Emperor Nero blamed the devastation on the Christian community in the city, initiating the empire's first persecution against the Christians.

In the Roman Empire, Christianity continued to spread, despite a campaign of persecution being initiated under Emperor Nero in 64. According to tradition, the apostles Peter and Paul were both martyred during this period: Traditionally, Roman authorities allegedly sentenced Peter to death by crucifixion at Vatican Hill. In accordance with the apocryphal Acts of Peter, he was crucified head down. As for Paul, the Second Epistle to Timothy states that he was arrested in Troad and brought back to Rome, where he was imprisoned and put on trial before being executed. The White Horse Temple, the first Buddhist temple in China, was traditionally constructed in 68, though it is not recorded in contemporary sources before 289.

In 62 or 64, the Baths of Nero were constructed. It stood between the Pantheon and the Stadium of Domitian and were listed among the most notable buildings in the city by Roman authors and became a much-frequented venue. In his final years, Seneca the Younger wrote De Providentia (discussing the problem of evil), De Beneficiis (discussing the award and reception of gifts and favours within society), and compiled a collection of 124 written near the end of his life. After Seneca's death in 65, a play named Octavia was written: the Roman tragedy focuses on three days in the year 62 during which Nero divorced and exiled his wife Claudia Octavia and married another (Poppaea Sabina). The play also deals with the irascibility of Nero and his inability to take heed of the philosopher Seneca's advice to rein in his passions. The Pharsalia, a poem detailing Caesar's civil war (49–45 BC), was also written during this decade.

Manning (2008) tentatively estimates the world population in AD 60 as 249 million.

Demographics 

Due to lack of reliable demographic data, estimates of the world population in the 1st century vary wildly, with estimates for AD 1 varying from 150 to 300 million. Demographers typically do not attempt to estimate most specific years in antiquity, instead giving approximate numbers for round years such as AD 1 or AD 200. However, attempts at reconstructing the world population in more specific years have been made, with Manning (2008) tentatively estimating the world population in AD 60 as 249 million.

Significant people
 Boudicca, rebellious British queen
 Gaius Suetonius Paulinus, Roman general
 Julius Civilis, leader of the Batavian rebellion against the Romans

References